Kirsten Carlijn Wild (born 15 October 1982) is a Dutch former professional racing cyclist, who rode professionally between 2004 and 2021, for eight professional teams. During her track cycling career, Wild rode at the Summer Olympic Games in 2012, 2016 and 2020, winning a bronze medal at the latter Games, in the omnium. She won eighteen medals including nine golds at the UCI Track Cycling World Championships, and eighteen medals including eight golds at the UEC European Track Championships. Wild also took over 100 victories in road racing, and won two medals at the UCI Road World Championships.

Career
At the 2012 London Olympics Wild finished sixth in the omnium, and was a member of the Dutch team that finished sixth in the team pursuit (together with Ellen van Dijk, Amy Pieters and Vera Koedooder).

In October 2017, one day after the 2017 UEC European Track Championships in Berlin where Wild won gold at the elimination race,  announced that Wild would join them for the 2018 season. She then joined  in 2019.

On 3 August 2019, after coming first in the RideLondon Classique, she was disqualified after her sudden change of direction before the finish line resulted in a crash involving several riders.

Wild competed at the delayed 2020 Summer Olympics in Tokyo in the madison, where she and Pieters finished fourth after crashing during the race, and the omnium, where she took the bronze medal. After taking over 100 wins on the road, Wild retired from road racing following the Holland Ladies Tour in August 2021. Following this she returned to the track before ending her career at the end of the year, racing in the European Championships, the World Championships (where she and Pieters won gold in the madison for the third consecutive year), and the Champions League.

Career achievements

Major results

Road

2004
 1st Young rider classification Holland Ladies Tour
 2nd Overall Novilon Damesronde van Drenthe
2005
 3rd Ronde van Gelderland
 7th Overall Novilon Damesronde van Drenthe
 7th Sparkassen Giro Bochum
2006
 1st Overall Ster Zeeuwsche Eilanden
1st Stages 2 & 3
 1st Omloop Door Middag-Humsterland
 2nd Time trial, National Road Championships
 3rd Overall Novilon Damesronde van Drenthe
 3rd Lowland International Rotterdam Tour
 4th Ronde van Gelderland
 4th Omloop van Borsele
 9th Open de Suède Vårgårda
 10th Rund um die Nürnberger Altstadt
2007
 1st Overall Tour de Pologne Feminin
1st Stages 2, 3 & 4
 1st Stage 3 Holland Ladies Tour
 2nd Overall Ster Zeeuwsche Eilanden
 5th Novilon Internationale Damesronde van Drenthe
 5th Ronde van Gelderland
 5th Rund um die Nürnberger Altstadt
 6th Trofeo Alfredo Binda-Comune di Cittiglio
 6th Grand Prix de Dottignies
 8th Omloop van Borsele
 10th Omloop Het Volk
2008
 1st Omloop Het Volk
 1st Omloop van Borsele
 2nd Time trial, National Road Championships
 2nd Overall Ster Zeeuwsche Eilanden
1st Prologue
 2nd Grand Prix de Dottignies
 3rd Tour of Flanders for Women
 3rd Novilon Eurocup Ronde van Drenthe
 3rd Rund um die Nürnberger Altstadt
 8th Ronde van Drenthe
 8th Ronde van Gelderland
 8th Sparkassen Giro Bochum
 10th GP Stad Roeselare
2009
 1st  Overall Ladies Tour of Qatar
 1st Overall Tour du Grand Montréal
1st Stages 1, 2 & 4
 1st Omloop van Borsele
 1st GP Stad Roeselare
 Open de Suède Vårgårda
1st Team time trial
2nd Road race
 1st Multidigitaal.nl – Blauwe StadTTT
 1st Rund um die Nürnberger Altstadt
 Giro d'Italia Femminile
1st Prologue & Stage 9
 2nd Time trial, National Road Championships
 2nd Overall Holland Ladies Tour
1st Points classification
1st Stages 1, 3 & 4
 2nd Tour of Flanders
 3rd Drentse 8 van Dwingeloo
 4th Grand Prix de Dottignies
 5th Trofeo Alfredo Binda-Comune di Cittiglio
 5th Ronde van Gelderland
 10th Ronde van Drenthe
2010
 1st  Overall Ladies Tour of Qatar
1st Stage 3
 1st Overall Ster Zeeuwsche Eilanden
1st Stages 1 (ITT) & 2
 Open de Suède Vårgårda
1st Team time trial
1st Road race
 1st Grand Prix de Dottignies
 1st Ronde van Gelderland
 1st Omloop van Borsele
 1st GP Stad Roeselare
 1st Stage 4 (ITT) Giro della Toscana Int. Femminile – Memorial Michela Fanini
 2nd Overall Tour of Chongming Island Stage race
1st Stage 2
 2nd Overall Holland Ladies Tour
1st Stages 4 & 5
 2nd Tour of Chongming Island World Cup
 3rd Time trial, National Road Championships
 3rd Tour of Flanders for Women
 3rd Novilon Eurocup Ronde van Drenthe
2011
 1st Omloop van Borsele
 2nd Overall Ster Zeeuwsche Eilanden
 2nd Ronde van Drenthe
 2nd Ronde van Gelderland
 Open de Suède Vårgårda
2nd Team time trial
6th Road race
 3rd Overall Holland Ladies Tour
 3rd 7-Dorpenomloop Aalburg
 4th Gooik–Geraardsbergen–Gooik
 5th Overall Energiewacht Tour
 6th GP Stad Roeselare
2012
 1st Overall Ster Zeeuwsche Eilanden
1st Stage 3
 1st Stage 2 Tour de Feminin-O cenu Českého Švýcarska
 1st Stage 3 Holland Ladies Tour
 2nd Ronde van Drenthe
 3rd  Team time trial, UCI Road World Championships
 3rd Overall Ladies Tour of Qatar
1st  Points classification
1st Stages 1 & 3
 4th Overall Belgium Tour
1st Stages 1 & 2
 4th Omloop van het Hageland
 4th Tour of Flanders for Women
 5th Novilon Euregio Cup
 7th Overall Energiewacht Tour
1st Stage 4a
 7th Ronde van Gelderland
 8th EPZ Omloop van Borsele
2013
 1st  Overall Ladies Tour of Qatar
1st  Points classification
1st Stages 2, 3 & 4
 1st Ronde van Gelderland
 1st Gent–Wevelgem
 Belgium Tour
1st Stages 2 & 3
 Holland Ladies Tour
1st  Points classification
1st Stages 1 & 3
 1st Stage 1 Giro d'Italia Femminile
 3rd Overall Energiewacht Tour
1st  Points classification
1st Stages 1, 2, 3b & 4
 3rd Sparkassen Giro Bochum
 3rd Profronde van Surhuisterveen
 5th Ronde van Drenthe World Cup
 10th Tour of Flanders for Women
2014
 1st  Overall Ladies Tour of Qatar
1st  Points classification
1st Stages 1, 3 & 4
 1st  Overall Tour of Chongming Island
1st  Points classification
1st Stages 1 & 2
 1st Ronde van Gelderland
 1st Novilon EDR Cup
 1st Tour of Chongming Island World Cup
 La Route de France
1st Stages 4 & 6
 2nd EPZ Omloop van Borsele
 2nd Ronde van Overijssel
 2nd La Course by Le Tour de France
 5th Omloop Het Nieuwsblad
 5th Open de Suède Vårgårda
 6th Ronde van Drenthe World Cup
 7th Overall Energiewacht Tour
1st  Points classification
1st Stages 1 & 2
 9th Gent–Wevelgem
 9th Sparkassen Giro
2015
 1st Overall Tour of Chongming Island
1st Points classification
1st Stages 1 & 2
 1st Novilon EDR Cup
 1st Ronde van Gelderland
 1st EPZ Omloop van Borsele
 1st Grand Prix cycliste de Gatineau
 1st Omloop van de IJsseldelta
 1st Stage 4 Tour de Bretagne Féminin
 2nd Tour of Chongming Island World Cup
 3rd La Madrid Challenge by La Vuelta
 4th Dwars door de Westhoek
 5th Overall Energiewacht Tour
1st  Points classification
1st Stage 3
 7th Ronde van Overijssel
 9th La Course by Le Tour de France
2016
 1st Women's Tour de Yorkshire
 1st RideLondon Classique
 Ladies Tour of Qatar
1st  Points classification
1st Stage 1
 Energiewacht Tour
1st Stages 4a & 5
 1st Stage 4 Tour of California
 2nd  Road race, UCI Road World Championships
 5th Omloop van de IJsseldelta
2017
 1st Stage 2 Holland Ladies Tour
 2nd Overall Tour of Chongming Island
1st Stage 1
 3rd Overall Santos Women's Tour
1st Stages 2 & 4
 5th Prudential RideLondon Classique
 7th Road race, UEC European Road Championships
 7th Cadel Evans Great Ocean Road Race
 7th Omloop van het Hageland
 10th Crescent Vårgårda UCI Women's WorldTour
2018
 1st RideLondon Classique
 Women's Tour de Yorkshire
1st  Points classification
1st Stage 1
 1st Stage 2 Giro Rosa
 2nd Crescent Vårgårda
 5th Overall Healthy Ageing Tour
1st  Points classification
1st Stage 3a
 7th Overall Tour of Chongming Island
1st Stage 3
2019
 1st Three Days of Bruges–De Panne
 1st Gent–Wevelgem
 2nd Overall Tour de Bretagne Féminin
1st Points classification
1st Stages 1 & 2
 3rd Overall Healthy Ageing Tour
1st Points classification
1st Stages 3 & 5
 6th Road race, UEC European Road Championships
 8th Ronde van Drenthe
2021
 6th Classic Brugge–De Panne

Classics results timeline

Track

2007
 3rd Individual pursuit, National Championships
2008
 National Championships
2nd Individual pursuit
2nd Points race
2009
 3rd Points race, National Championships
2010
 2nd Individual pursuit, National Championships
2011
 National Championships
1st  Madison
2nd Individual pursuit
 1st  Team pursuit, 2011–12 UCI Track Cycling World Cup, Astana
 3rd  Omnium, UCI World Championships
 3rd  Omnium, UEC European Track Championships
2013
 UEC European Championships
1st  Points race
2nd  Omnium
2014
 2nd Omnium, Grand Prix of Poland
 International Track Women & Men
3rd Omnium
3rd Points race
2015
 UCI World Championships
1st  Scratch
3rd  Omnium
 1st  Omnium, 2014–15 UCI Track Cycling World Cup, Cali
 1st  Madison, National Championships
 Trofeu CAR Anadia Portugal
1st Omnium
1st Scratch
 6 giorni delle rose – Fiorenzuola
1st Scratch
2nd Omnium
2nd Points race
 Irish International Track GP
1st Scratch
1st Omnium
 2nd  Scratch, UEC European Track Championships
2016
 UEC European Championships
1st  Elimination race
1st  Points race
2nd  Omnium
3rd  Scratch
3rd  Madison
 National Championships
1st  Madison
1st  Individual pursuit
1st  Scratch
1st  Points race
 1st Omnium, Apeldoorn Championships
 2nd  Scratch, UCI World Championships
2017
 UEC European Championships
1st  Elimination race
2nd  Omnium
3nd  Madison
 National Championships
1st  Madison
1st  Omnium
1st  Scratch
 1st  Omnium, 2017–18 UCI Track Cycling World Cup, Pruszków
 Belgian International Meeting
1st Omnium
2nd Points race
2nd Madison (with Nina Kessler)
 1st Madison, Zesdaagse Vlaanderen-Gent (with Amy Pieters)
 UCI World Championships
2nd  Omnium
3rd  Points race
 2nd Points race, Revolution Series – Champions League – Round 2, Glasgow
 8th Overall Six Day London
2018
 UCI World Championships
1st  Scratch
1st  Omnium
1st  Points race
2nd  Madison
 UEC European Championships
1st  Scratch
1st  Omnium
3rd  Madison
 1st  Points race, National Championships
 Revolution Series Champions League, Round 3 – Manchester
1st Points race
2nd Scratch
 Six Days of Bremen
1st Madison
1st Omnium
2019
 UCI World Championships
1st  Omnium
1st  Madison
2nd  Scratch
3rd  Points race
 European Games
1st  Omnium
1st  Scratch
2nd  Madison
 UEC European Championships
1st  Elimination race
1st  Omnium
3rd  Madison
2020
 UCI World Championships
1st  Madison
1st  Scratch
2021
 UCI World Championships
1st  Madison
3rd  Points race
 2nd Endurance, UCI Track Champions League
1st Scratch, London I
 3rd  Omnium, Summer Olympics

National records

Wild was the last three times part of the 3000 m team pursuit squad when they established a new Dutch national record. She is together with Ellen van Dijk and Vera Koedooder the current national record holder, with a time of 3:20.013 (53.996 km/h) established at the 2012 Summer Olympics on 4 August 2012. After the 2011–12 track cycling season the UCI changed the discipline into a 4000 m team pursuit with four riders.

See also

List of Dutch Olympic cyclists

References

External links
 
 
 
 
 
 
 
 

1982 births
Living people
Dutch female cyclists
Sportspeople from Almelo
Cyclists at the 2012 Summer Olympics
Cyclists at the 2016 Summer Olympics
Cyclists at the 2020 Summer Olympics
Olympic cyclists of the Netherlands
UCI Road World Championships cyclists for the Netherlands
Dutch cyclists at the UCI Track Cycling World Championships
UCI Track Cycling World Champions (women)
European Championships (multi-sport event) gold medalists
Dutch track cyclists
Cyclists at the 2019 European Games
European Games medalists in cycling
European Games gold medalists for the Netherlands
European Games silver medalists for the Netherlands
Medalists at the 2020 Summer Olympics
Olympic medalists in cycling
Olympic bronze medalists for the Netherlands
20th-century Dutch women
21st-century Dutch women
Cyclists from Overijssel